Crambus sperryellus is a moth in the family Crambidae. It was described by Alexander Barrett Klots in 1940. It is found in the US states of California and adjacent Arizona.

References

Crambini
Moths described in 1940
Moths of North America